The Karoo eremomela (Eremomela gregalis), also known as the yellow-rumped eremomela, is a species of bird formerly placed in the "Old World warbler" assemblage, but now placed in the family Cisticolidae.
It is found in Namibia and South Africa.
Its natural habitat is subtropical or tropical dry shrubland.

References

External links
 Karoo eremomela - Species text in The Atlas of Southern African Birds.

Karoo eremomela
Birds of Southern Africa
Fauna of South Africa
Karoo eremomela
Taxonomy articles created by Polbot